Ratanachai Sor Vorapin (born November 1, 1976) is a professional boxer and a former WBO bantamweight champion. He is the younger brother of Ratanapol Sor Vorapin, a former IBF strawweight champion. He is considered one of the few Thai boxers who have the opportunity to fight abroad very often. Sor Vorapin has fought 16 times abroad.

Professional career
After winning 6 consecutive matches, he fought Ruangroj Kiatkriangkrai for the Thai light flyweight championship where he won by unanimous decision on September 28, 1992. In his first defense of that title 73 days later, he lost to Kompayak Chor Charoen on points and tasted his first defeat. He regained it on March 26, 1994 with TKO victory over Suksawat Torboonlert in two rounds.

Sor Vorapin had his first shot at a world title on April 24, 1999 where he battled Mark Johnson for the vacant IBF super flyweight title. Unsuccessfully, he lost via unanimous decision.

He then moved up in weight where he took on Tim Austin for the IBF bantamweight title on December 15, 2001. Like his previous attempt for a world crown, Sor Vorapin lost the match in a similar fashion.

In his third world title shot, Sor Vorapin finally achieved victory. There, he won the WBO bantamweight title on May 7, 2004 with a unanimous decision win over Cruz Carbajal. He was the first Thai boxer to be crowned world champion of this institution. Following some wins in seven ordinary matches, Sor Vorapin defended his title by outpointing Mauricio Martinez on August 5, 2005. On his second title defense, however, he was TKO'd in seven rounds by Jhonny González on October 29, 2005.

He attempted to regain the title by challenging Gerry Peñalosa who won it from González. In the aftermath of the fight, Vorapin was defeated by an 8th round stoppage from Peñalosa on April 6, 2008 in the event "Invasion: Philippines vs. The World" at the Araneta Coliseum. Peñalosa knocked down the Thai thrice, in the 5th, 7th, and earlier in the eighth.

On September 14, 2008, Filipino boxer Michael Domingo scored a 9th-round technical knockout victory over Ratanachai Sor Vorapin at the New Cebu Coliseum to retain the regional World Boxing Organization Oriental bantamweight title.

Life after boxing
After retirement, he has worked as an assistant trainer at his former boxing gym Sor Vorapin. Currently, he earns his living as a motorcycle taxi driver.

See also
List of bantamweight boxing champions

References

External links
 

 

1976 births
Living people
Bantamweight boxers
Super-flyweight boxers
World bantamweight boxing champions
World Boxing Organization champions
Southpaw boxers
Ratanachai Sor Vorapin
Ratanachai Sor Vorapin